The 1986 Illinois Fighting Illini football team was an American football team that represented the University of Illinois at Urbana-Champaign during the 1986 NCAA Division I-A football season. In their seventh year under head coach Mike White, the Illini compiled a 4–7 record and finished in a tie for sixth place in the Big Ten Conference.

The team's offensive leaders were quarterback Shane Lamb with 1,414 passing yards, running back Keith Jones with 534 rushing yards, and Stephen Pierce with 602 receiving yards.

Schedule

Games summaries

No. 6 Nebraska

at Ohio State

at No. 3 Michigan

No. 16 Iowa

References

Illinois
Illinois Fighting Illini football seasons
Illinois Fighting Illini football